was a Japanese composer, music educator, conductor and clarinetist.

Biography 
Setoguchi was born on 28 June 1868, in Kagoshima Prefecture, Japan, in what is now the city of Tarumizu. In 1882, Setoguchi enlisted as a clarinetist in the military band of the Imperial Japanese Navy in Yokosuka. Later, he became an orchestra conductor. During a concert tour in 1907 through 16 European countries, he enjoyed great success, and became known as the Japanese Sousa. In 1910 he accompanied Prince Yoshihito on his journey to London for the coronation celebrations of King George V of the United Kingdom. He retired in 1917.

After his active service he was a professor of music at various universities and music conservatories.

He died in Azabu, Tokyo on 8 November 1941 of a cerebral hemorrhage.

As a composer he wrote a number of songs and military marches. In addition, he reformed Japanese military music between World War I and World War II.

Compositions

Works for wind orchestra (military band) 
 1897: Warship March (also: "Gunkan March"), based on the song “Warship (Gunkan)" - text: Hiraku Toriyama. Official march of the Imperial Japanese Navy and of its successor, the present-day Japan Maritime Self-Defense Force. 
 1914: Nipponkai Kaisen
 1941: Mamore Taiheiyo
 Battle of the Yellow Sea - text: Takeki Owada
 Flag of the Naval Ensign - text: Takeki Owada
 Gakushuin 50th Anniversary Song
 Harbor
 Hiroshi Kusunoki (Our Exile)
 Night Battle of the Tsushima Sea - text: Takeki Owada
 Obstruction Corps - text: Takeki Owada
 Qingdao Occupation Songs
 Sixth Submarine Lost - text: Takeki Owada
 Song of the Shikishima Warship (also: Warship -Shikishima- March) - text: Masaomi Ban
 South Manchuria Song
 Spring Dance
 The Athletics Grand March
 The Battle Of Tsushima Sea March - text: Takeki Owada
 The Man of War March
 1937: The Patriotic March (Aikoku Koshinkyoku) - (together with: Ushimatsu Saito) - text: Yukio Morikawa
 The War of Mongolian Invasion
 Tokyo Tokyo ode march
 Watch Out, march
 Women's Patriotic Song
 Working Vessels - text: Takeki Owada and Nobutsuna Sasaki

Bibliography 
 Hitoshi Matsushita: A checklist of published instrumental music by Japanese composers, Tokyo: Academia Music Ltd., 1989, 181 p., 
 Masazirou Tanimura: "Warship, the 100-year march wake", Omura Bookstore, 2000, 
 Paul E. Bierley, William H. Rehrig: The heritage encyclopedia of band music: composers and their music, Westerville, Ohio: Integrity Press, 1991,

External links 
 Biography 

1868 births
1941 deaths
19th-century clarinetists
19th-century classical composers
19th-century conductors (music)
19th-century Japanese composers
19th-century Japanese educators
19th-century Japanese male musicians
19th-century Japanese people
20th-century clarinetists
20th-century classical composers
20th-century conductors (music)
20th-century Japanese composers
20th-century Japanese educators
20th-century Japanese male musicians
20th-century Japanese people
Bandleaders
Concert band composers
Japanese classical clarinetists
Japanese classical composers
Japanese conductors (music)
Japanese male classical composers
Japanese male conductors (music)
Japanese military musicians
Japanese music educators
Japanese Romantic composers
March musicians
Military music composers
Musicians from Kagoshima Prefecture
People of Meiji-period Japan